K261 or K-261 may refer to:

K-261 (Kansas highway), a state highway in Kansas
HMS Mourne (K261), a former UK Royal Navy ship
K.261 Adagio in E for Violin and Orchestra (Mozart) (1776)